Giant Leap may refer to:

 1 Giant Leap, concept band and media project
 1 Giant Leap (album), 2002 album
 "One Giant Leap", the third episode of the NBC supernatural drama series Heroes
 "That's one small step for a man, one giant leap for mankind", the famous words of Apollo 11 Commander Neil Armstrong when he became the first human to both set foot on the Moon, and the first human to step onto another world.